White Pigeon was a town in Keokuk County, Iowa.

See also
Hinkletown, Iowa
Kinross, Iowa

References

Populated places in Keokuk County, Iowa